Pugettia producta, known as the northern kelp crab or shield-backed kelp crab, is a species of crab in the family Epialtidae.

Distribution
Found along the Pacific Coast of North America from southern Alaska to northern Mexico.

Description 
Upper carapace typically dark brown, olive, or olive brown. Underside surface tends to be more vibrant having colors such as red, yellow or orange. Younger crabs may be lighter olive brown or reddish brown. The carapace is a badge like shape similar to a police officer's badge or shield; hence the secondary name shield-backed crab. Carapace is curved and smooth, with a slick texture. The front of the crab has a protrusion called a rostrum, extending the carapace and used in feeding. They have large chelipeds used for defense and feeding. The northern kelp crab is part of the spider crab family and exhibits the long many jointed hairless legs associated with the family. Their long legs and shield-like carapace are key identifying factors.

Sexual Dimorphism 
Male crabs tend to be slightly larger than female crab at about 93mm (4 in) across the carapace. Females tend to be 7.8 cm (~3in). Female crabs exhibit a broader back and smaller chelipeds than males.

Behavior 
Northern kelp crabs are known for their association with kelp and their similar coloration. Their long many-jointed legs have evolved to help them climb bull kelp and also provide help climbing man-made pilings. These crabs are also common in lower intertidal zones in beds of algae or eelgrass. They may also be found under rocks or shelters at extreme low tides within the intertidal zones.

Northern kelp crabs are herbivores with seasonal preferences. In the summer months when algae is prevalent, they eat nearly exclusively algae. They eat kelp, rockweed, sargassum and some types of red algae. Whereas in the winter, they are more carnivorous, eating small mussels, barnacles, bryozoans, and hydroids. This seasonal adaptation is an evolutionary advantage when preferred food is scarce.

The northern kelp crab can be differentiated from similar species like the decorator crabs by its two rows of hooked setae right behind its rostrum. The northern kelp crab sometimes attaches bits of kelp and seaweed to these hooked setae to store as food for later. The northern kelp crab does not decorate its carapace as other majid crabs do.

Predation 
Northern kelp crabs are predated by a few different animals in different stages of life. Adults are frequently eaten by cabezon, gulls, sea otters and staghorn sculpins. Sea otters are significant predators for the northern kelp crab within kelp forests. As pelagic larvae (zoeae) they are eaten by velella velella or the by-the-wind sailor.

The northern kelp crab can be parasitized by heterosaccus californicus (rhizocephalan sacculinid barnacle) that exhibits as a brown mass extending from the crab's underbelly. Once the crab has been parasitized, it will only molt one more time. During this molt the barnacle then pushes its reproductive sac through the crabs molt-softened carapace. This damages or destroys the crabs male reproductive organs and which leads males to exhibit some female characteristics. These parasite-damaged males may become hermaphroditic and produce both eggs and sperm. Parasite-damaged females may have a faster development of mature characteristics.

Reproduction and Lifecycle 
Adult crabs migrate to waters as deep as 75m to mate. They join together, feed, then mate. Females may carry eggs during most parts of the year but are rarely seen in the south Puget Sound in May, September, and October. These clutches may be from 34,000 to 84,000 eggs. Eggs change color as they age. They begin bright orange, change to red as they mature and hatch when they are a gray-ish purple color. This maturating and development may take anywhere from a month to nearly a year.

This crab has a terminal molt which may end up covered with barnacles, limpits or bits of algae.

Human Consumption 
Northern kelp crabs are not attractive for human consumption. They are difficult to purposely catch and bear very little meat.  Their chelipeds are large and adept. They have an aggressively strong pinch.

References

External links 
 iNaturalist: Northern Kelp Crab
 WoRMS taxon details: Pugettia producta

Majoidea
Crustaceans of the eastern Pacific Ocean
Crustaceans described in 1840